Brewongle is a locality in the Bathurst Region of New South Wales, Australia.

References 

Localities in New South Wales